Isaiah 7:14 is a verse in the seventh chapter of the Book of Isaiah in which the prophet Isaiah, addressing king Ahaz of Judah, promises that God will destroy the king's enemies before a child born to an almah is weaned. The Hebrew word  ‘almāh translates into English as "young woman," although it is translated in the Koine Greek Septuagint as  parthenos, meaning virgin, and was subsequently picked up by the gospels of Matthew and Luke and used as a messianic prophecy; the prophecy is therefore understood by Christians to refer to the Virgin birth of Jesus.

Biblical scholars agree that the word "almah" means a young woman of childbearing age rather than a virgin. Most English translations of the Bible use "virgin" with some exceptions, such as in the Revised Standard Version where "young woman" is used; as such, Isaiah 7:14 continues to be one of the most controversial Bible verses.

Isaiah's prophesy to Ahaz

Context: Isaiah 7:1-25
The Book of Isaiah was assembled over several centuries, beginning in the 8th century BCE. Chapters 1-39 refer mostly to events of the 8th century, but Isaiah 7:1-25 are the product of a 7th century Josianic redaction (i.e., an editing in the reign of King Josiah, c. 640–609 BCE). They present the 8th century King Ahaz (reigned c. 732–716 BC) as a faithless monarch who rejects God's promise of protection for his dynasty and city, but the purpose of the original 8th century narrative was to dissuade Ahaz' son, Hezekiah, from entering into alliance with other kingdoms to oppose the Assyrian Empire, the regional hegemon of the day.

The oracle: Isaiah 7:1-10
Isaiah 7:18:15 deals with the prophet Isaiah's attempt to persuade King Ahaz not to join the kings of Israel (also called Ephraim) and Syria (Aram-Damascus) in their rebellion against their Assyrian overlord. Isaiah 7:1-8 make up a prologue explaining that Israel and Syria have laid siege to Jerusalem in an effort to replace him with a non-Davidic king who will join them. 

When Ahaz ... was king of Judah, Rezin, king of Syria, and Pekah ... king of Israel, marched on Jerusalem, they were unable to prevail against it. When the House of David was told that Syria had allied itself with Ephraim, their hearts and the hearts of their people trembled ... But the Lord said to Isaiah, "Go out to meet Ahaz, you and Shearjashub your son, ... and say to him, 'Be firm and keep calm ...' In the face of the threat God announces to Ahaz: 'It will not succeed, it will not happen.'

God's sign: Isaiah 7:11-16
Having delivered God's message Isaiah tells Ahaz to ask for a sign to confirm that it is a true prophecy, meaning that Ahaz is being called upon to affirm the divine covenant made with the house of David and threatened by the coalition of enemy kings, but Ahaz refuses, and Isaiah replies that he will have a sign whether he asks for it or not:

7:11 
"Ask a sign from the Lord your God, from lowest Sheol or from highest heaven."
7:12 
But Ahaz said, "I will not ask, and I will not test the Lord."
7:13 
Then he retorted: "Listen, house of David! Is it not enough to try the patience of men? Will you also try the patience of my God?
7:14 
therefore the Lord himself shall give you a sign: the maiden is with child and she will bear a son, and will call his name Immanuel.
7:15 
By the time he learns to reject the bad and choose the good, he will be eating curds and honey.
7:16 
For before the child knows to reject the bad and choose the good, desolation will come upon the land of the two kings before whom you now cower."

A sign, in this context, means a special event which confirms the prophet's words. Ahaz's sign is to be the birth of a son to an almah, who will name him Immanuel, "God is with us"; the significance of the sign is not the identity of the child or his mother (scholars agree that "almah" refers to a woman of childbearing age and has nothing to do with virginity) but the meaning of his name ("God is with us") and the role it plays in identifying the length of time before God will destroy the Ephraimite-Syrian coalition (before the child learns right from wrong).

Aftermath: Isaiah 7:17-25
Ahaz turned to Assyria to fend off the threat from Israel and Syria, but the price he paid was to become an Assyrian vassal. His son and successor Hezekiah (ruled c. 715-686) rebelled, but the Assyrians devastated his kingdom and put Jerusalem under siege, and Hezekiah was able to save himself only by paying tribute.
A century later, in the time of King Josiah, the prophecy of Isaiah was revised to present Ahaz as a faithless king who rejected God's promise of protection, with the result that God brought Assyria to devastate the land until a new and faithful king (presumably Josiah) would arise to restore peace. The added prophesy, describing the devastation that would come upon Judah at some unspecified future date (future, that is, from the perspective of Isaiah and Ahaz) when God would call up Assyria, is given in verses 7:17–25: "In that day every place where there used to be a thousand vines ... will be turned over to thorns and briars".

Gospel of Matthew

Matthew's use of Isaiah
The Gospel of Matthew presents Jesus's ministry as largely the fulfilment of prophecies from Isaiah, but in the time of Jesus the Israelite Jews no longer spoke Hebrew, and Isaiah had to be translated into Greek and Aramaic, the two commonly used languages. The Greek translation, the Septuagint, mistranslated the word almah, meaning a young woman of childbearing age who had not yet given birth, as parthenos, which means virgin. This gave the author of Matthew the opportunity to interpret Jesus as the fulfilment of prophecy: he makes Jesus Immanuel, God is with us (Matthew 1:23), the divine representative on earth, and underlines Jesus' status as "Son of God" by asserting that Joseph did not have sexual intercourse with Mary before she gave birth (Matthew 1:25).

Revised Standard Version
When the Revised Standard Version translators rendered "almah" as "young woman" in 1952 it immediately became a center of controversy for conservative Christians, who believed that this passage predicted the virgin birth of Jesus. The RSV quickly replaced the KJV in many churches across America, but fundamentalist American Christians argued that nowhere in the Old Testament was an almah anything other than a young unmarried girl, and one pastor publicly burned a copy of the RSV. Isaiah 7:14 became a litmus test of orthodoxy among conservatives, but most modern Bible translations use "young woman".

On his blog, New Testament scholar Bart D. Ehrman has argued that the original meaning of the word parthenos in the Septuagint (i.e., the Hebrew Bible translated by Hellenistic Jews in Koine Greek) is "young woman", not "virgin", but the word changed meaning over the centuries; thus the authors of Matthew and Luke believed instead that Isaiah had predicted a virgin birth for the coming Messiah, using the common understanding of the term in their time.

Uses

Music
The King James Version of this verse is cited as texts in the English-language oratorio "Messiah" by George Frideric Handel (HWV 56).

See also
 Jesus and Messianic prophecy
 Maher-shalal-hash-baz
 Matthew 1:23
 Old Testament messianic prophecies quoted in the New Testament
 Pele-joez-el-gibbor-abi-ad-sar-shalom

References

Bibliography
  
 
  
 
 
 
  
 
 

Book of Isaiah
Christian messianism
Hebrew Bible verses
House of Pekah
Virgin birth of Jesus